The Chagatai Khans were the monarchs of the Chagatai Khanate from Chagatai Khan's inheritance of the state in 1227 to their removal from power by the Dzungars and their vassals in 1687. The power of the Chagatai Khans varied; from its beginning, the khanate was one of the weakest of the Mongol states and often its rulers were merely figureheads for ambitious conquerors (see Kaidu and Timur).

Note: The following list is incomplete. It excludes several collateral lines that ruled over minor territories and were relatively unimportant.

Khans of the Chagatai Khanate

Blue rows signifies nominal rule.

Khans of the Western Chagatai Khanate and the Eastern Chagatai Khanate (Moghulistan)

Transoxiana remained in the hands of Timur and his successors. For a continued list of rulers of Moghulistan see below.

Khans of Moghulistan

Green shaded row signifies rule of usurper.

Khans of Western Moghulistan and Khans of Eastern Moghulistan (Uyghurstan)

Khans of Kyrgyz Khanate

Said Khan successors in Yarkent

Abdurashid Khan (in Aksu 1521–1533) 1533–1560, son of Sultan Said Khan
Abdul Karim Khan (Yarkand) 1560–1591, eldest son of Abdurashid Khan
Muhammad Khan (in Turfan 1588–1591) 1591–1610, 5th son of Abdurashid Khan, in 1603 was visited in Yarkand by Portuguese Jesuit Bento de Gois, who was searching land ways from India to Ming China, headed trade mission on behalf of Moghul Emperor of India Akbar the Great and had a Letter of Safe Conduct, granted by Akbar and addressed to Muhammad Khan, with him.
Shudja ad Din Ahmad Khan 1610–1618, son of Muhammad Khan, grandson of Abdurashid Khan, was killed in 1618 during hunting 
Kuraysh Sultan 1618, son of Yunus Sultan, grandson of Abdurashid Khan, ruled only 9 days before he was killed
Abd al-Latif (Afak) Khan 1618–1630, second son of Shudja ad-Din Ahmad Khan, who was only 13 when was set up on khanship, died in the age of 25
Sultan Ahmad Khan (Pulat Khan) 1630–1633, first son of Timur Sultan, who was the first son of Shuja ad-Din Ahmad Khan and died in 1615
Mahmud Sultan (Qilich Khan) 1633–1636, second son of Timur Sultan, died in the age of 22 when was poisoned in 1636 by Khoja Yahiya (died in 1646), son of Khoja Ishak, founder of Ishakiyya branch of Nakshbandi Khojagan Sufi Order, followers of which were known as Kara Taghliks.
Sultan Ahmad Khan (Pulat Khan) 1636–1638, restored on khanship with help of Khoja Yahiya, who was granted village Guma near Khotan by Sultan Ahmad Khan, resigned in 1638 on demands of emirs in favor of Abdullah Khan, died in 1640 in the age of 27
Abdullah Khan (in Turfan 1634/5–1638/9) 1638–1669, eldest son of Abduraim Khan, grandson of Abdurashid Khan, expelled to India in 1669, where he was received by Moghul Emperor Aurangzeb, who arranged his Hajj to Mecca, died in 1675 in the age of 67, buried in Agra
Nur ad-Din Sultan ( in Aksu 1649–1667) 1667–1668 in Kashgar and Yengisar, youngest son of Abdullah Khan, died in 1668 in the age of 31, reigned one year with help of the Kara Yanchuks , mercenaries from Dzungars and Kyrgyz tribes, who were first recruited on service in Yarkand Khanate during last years of reigning of Abdullah Khan.
Ismail Khan (in Chalish 1666–1669, in Aksu 1669–1670) 1669, 5th son of Abduraim Khan, grandson of Abdurashid Khan, disciple of Kara Taghlik leader Khoja Ubaidullah (Khoja Shadi), son of Khoja Yahiya, was declared a Khan in Aksu after Abdullah Khan fled to India.
YuIbars Khan ( In Kashgar 1638–1667, since age of 8) 1669–1670, eldest son of Abdullah Khan, disciple of Ak Taghlik Khoja Mohammad Yusuf and his son Appak Khoja, during his reign positions of Ak Taghliks in Yarkand Khanate greatly increased, was killed in 1670 by Dzungar supporter Erka Bek in the age of 40
Abd al Latif Sultan 1670, son of Yulbars Khan, who was set up on khanship by Ak Taghliks, was killed in the same 1670 by Kara Taghliks with all other sons of Yulbars Khan
Ismail Khan 1670–1678, restored on 2 April 1670 by Kara Taghliks, expelled Appak Khoja and his son Yahia Khoja from the country in 1670, in 1678 captured by Dzungars, who were invited by Ak Taghlik leader Appak Khoja using recommendation letter from 5th Dalai Lama, died in Ili River Valley ( Baghistan) in 1680 in the age of 56.
Abd ar-Rashid Khan II (in Turfan 1680–1682) 1678–1680, eldest son of Sultan Said Baba Khan, set up on khanship by Dzungar Galdan Boshugtu Khan, who came to Yarkand with Appak Khoja.
Muhammad Imin Khan (Muhammad Amin Khan) (in Turfan 1682–1690) 1680–1681 in Chalish, second son of Sultan Said Baba Khan
Appak Khoja 1680–1690, died in 1694, set up himself on khanship after expelling Abd ar-Rashid Khan II from Yarkand with help of Dzungars, expelled Kara Taghlik leader Khoja Daniyal into Kashmir.
Muhammad Imin Khan (Muhammad Amin Khan) 1690–1692, was recalled from Turpan and elected a Khan on Kurultai of Kashgar and Yarkand Beks, was killed in 1692 after losing a battle with Appak Khoja near Kargalik
Yahiya Khoja (in Kashgar 1690–1692) 1692–1695, son of Appak Khoja, set up on khanship by Appak Khoja, killed in 1695 by Hanim Pasha
Hanim Pasha (Hanum Padshah) 1695, sister of Muhammad Imin Khan, widow of Appak Khoja, was killed in 1695
Akbash Khan 1695–1705, youngest son of Sultan Said Baba Khan, great grandson of Abdurashid Khan, disciple of Kara Taghliks, recalled Kara Taghlik leader Khoja Daniyal (died in 1735) from exile to resist Ak Taghliks and Dzungars, fled to India in 1705
The remnants of the state fell to two different rival branches of Khojas- Ak Taghliks and Kara Taghliks. Aqtaghlyq branch of Khojas, a confederation under the influence of the Dzungars, took power in Kashgar where Ahmad Khoja, son of Yahiya Khoja, was declared a Khan. In Yarkand Kara Taghliks took power with Khoja Daniyal being declared a Khan, that caused civil war between Kashgar and Yarkand.
In 1713 remnant of Yarkant Khanate - Altishar ( union of 6 cities)-became dependency of Dzungar Khanate under Tsewang Rabtan, paying annual tribute from all 6 cities in amount of one silver tanga from soul, for Yarkand it was established in amount of 100,000 silver tangas, for Kashgar-67,000 silver tangas, this time Kara Taghliks were established by Dzungars to be responsible for collecting tribute.  In 1752 Altishar restored its independence after revolt against Dzungar Khanate under leadership of Kara Taghlik leader Khoja Yusup, son of Khoja Daniyal.  In 1755 sons of Ahmad Khoja and great grandsons of Appak Khoja, Ak Taghliks Burhan ad-Din Khoja and Jahan Khoja were rescued by Qings troops in Ili River Valley from Dzungar's captivity and sent to Altishar to claim mandate of Qing China for the country. In ensuing bloody war with Kara Taghliks brothers emerged victorious and established total control of Altishar in 1756 but refused to submit to Qings after that.  In 1759 Altishar was conquered by Qing China, that created province Nanlu (Southern Road) on its territory in 1760, while province Beilu (Northern Road) was created on the territory of former Dzungar Khanate, that was exterminated by Qing China in 1756.

Mansur Khan successors in Uyghurstan
The following successors to Mansur Khan possessed the titles of Little Khans sitting in Turpan, contrary to the Great Khans sitting in Yarkand.
Shah Khan 1543–1570, eldest son of Mansur Khan
Muhammad Khan ibn Mansur Khan, 1570 
Koraish Sultan (Khotan 1533–1588; Chalish 1570–88) 1570–1588, son of Abdurashid Khan, expelled to India in 1588 by Abdul Karim Khan, where he was received by Moghul Emperor Akbar the Great, who gave him one of regions of India in suyurgal.
Muhammad Khan (in Kashgaria 1591–1610), 1588–1591, son of Abdurashid Khan
Abduraim Khan 1591–1636, youngest son of Abdurashid Khan
Muhammad Khashim Sultan (in Chalish) 1608–1610, son of Khudabende Sultan, who was son of Koraish Sultan
Abdullah Khan (in Chalish, in Kashgaria 1638–1669) 1636–1638, eldest son of Abduraim Khan
Abu'l Muhammad Khan 1636–1653, son of Abduraim Khan
Sultan Said Baba Khan ( in Kumul 1636–1653) 1653, died in 1680 in the age of 53, 4th son of Abduraim Khan
Ibrahim Sultan ( in Khotan 1638–1653) 1653–1655, son of Abduraim Khan, was killed in 1655
Sultan Said Baba Khan (restored) 1655–1680
Abd ar-Rashid Khan II (in Chalish 1678–1680) 1680–1682, eldest son of Sultan Said Baba Khan, died in 1694
 Muhammad Imin Khan (Muhammad Amin Khan) 1682–1690, second son of Sultan Said Baba Khan, great grandson of Abdurashid Khan
Annexed by the Dzungars. After exterminating of Dzungar Khanate by Qing China in 1756, remnants of Dynasty survived in semi-autonomous Kumul Khanate till the 20th century, last ruler of which Maqsud Shah died in 1930.

References

Citations

Sources 

 
 Kutlukov M About foundation of Yarkent Khanate (1465–1759), "Pan" publishing house. Almata, 1990.
 Shah Mahmud Churas  Chronicles (written in 1670 in Yarkand in 118 chapters) Translation and research by Akimushkin O.F.  Publishing house of eastern literature "Nauka". Moscow, 1976.

Chagatai